Skarnes Station is a railway station located at Skarnes in Sør-Odal, Norway. It is on the Kongsvinger Line (Kongsvingerbanen). The station was constructed in 1862 as part of the opening of the Kongsvinger Line. The rail station building was designed by the architectural firm of Heinrich Ernst Schirmer and Wilhelm von Hanno. 

The station is served ten times daily Oslo Commuter Rail line R14 operated by Vy and the trains to Sweden operated by Vy Tåg on weekends.

References

Railway stations in Hedmark
Railway stations on the Kongsvinger Line
Railway stations opened in 1862
1862 establishments in Norway